Uropachys is a genus of flies in the family Dolichopodidae, endemic to Kauai of the Hawaiian Islands. It is part of the Eurynogaster complex of genera.

Species
Included species:
 Uropachys clavastylus (Hardy & Kohn, 1964)
 Uropachys crassicercus (Hardy & Kohn, 1964)
 Uropachys flavicrurus (Hardy & Kohn, 1964)
 Uropachys fleacercus Evenhuis, 2019
 Uropachys fusticercus (Hardy & Kohn, 1964)
 Uropachys hawaiensis (Parent, 1934)
 Uropachys mediacercus Evenhuis, 2019
 Uropachys palustricola (Hardy & Kohn, 1964)
 Uropachys politicocercus Evenhuis, 2019

Species moved to Eurynogaster:
 Uropachys pulverea (Hardy & Kohn, 1964)

References

Hydrophorinae
Dolichopodidae genera
Insects of Hawaii
Endemic fauna of Hawaii
Taxa named by Octave Parent